Milena Pavlović-Barili (alt. Barilli; ; 5 November 1909 – 6 March 1945) was a Serbian painter and poet. She is the most notable female artist of Serbian modernism.

Biography
Her Italian father, Bruno Barilli, was an influential composer. Her Serbian mother, Danica Pavlović-Barili, a descendant of the Karađorđević dynasty, who served as lady in waiting to Queen Maria of Yugoslavia and was tasked with improving her Serbian language. She was also superintendent at the court of King Alexander I of Yugoslavia, who was her second cousin once removed. Danica also had artistic talent and studied art in Munich, where she met her husband Bruno Barilli in 1905, whom she married in an Orthodox ceremony 4 years later in the city of Požarevac.

Milena herself studied at the Royal School of Arts in Belgrade, Serbia (1922–1926) and in Munich (1926–1928). In the early 1930s, she left Serbia and returned only for brief visits until the outbreak of World War II. During her stays in Spain, Rome, Paris and London, where she socialised with Jean Cocteau and André Breton, she was influenced by many western schools and artists, notably Giorgio de Chirico. After 1939, she lived and worked in New York where her career peaked as an illustrator for Vogue, Harper's Bazaar, and other publications under the J. Walter Thompson advertising agency. In 1941, she appeared in the Twentieth Annual of Advertising Art, and before her death, she was commissioned to design costumes for Gian Carlo Menotti's ballet Sebastian and a production of Shakespeare's A Midsummer Night's Dream; these were never completed. She died of a heart attack at the age of 35, having sustained serious injuries in a horse-riding accident the previous summer. She was cremated, according to her American husband's wishes, and buried in a cemetery in Rome. Her envelope-pushing and taboo-breaking work graced galleries all over the world, her ideas sitting at the forefront of the surrealist movement.

The topics of her work varied from portraits to imaginative interpretations of biblical stories. The motifs often included dream-like situations, veils, angels, statues of Venus, and Harlequins. Many of her works are parts of permanent exhibitions in Rome, New York City, Museum of Contemporary Art (Belgrade), and her hometown of Požarevac, where the house in which she was born has been converted into a museum in her honor. In 1943, Pavlović-Barili's work was included in Peggy Guggenheim's show Exhibition by 31 Women at the Art of This Century gallery in New York.

Legacy
She was born in Požarevac, and the house in which she was born is now a museum, Milena Pavlović-Barili Gallery, dedicated to her life.

Gallery

Artworks about Milena and her work 
Performance

 Milena ZeVu, ‘Milena’ homage to the Serbian artist Milena Pavlovic Barilli (1909-1945), House of Jevrem Grujic, March 2019, Belgrade, Serbia

See also 
 List of painters from Serbia
 Serbian art

References

External links

 Translated works by Milena Pavlović-Barili

1909 births
1945 deaths
People from Požarevac
Serbian women poets
Serbian women writers
Eastern Orthodox Christians from Serbia
Serbian people of Italian descent
Deaths by horse-riding accident in the United States
Burials in the Protestant Cemetery, Rome
20th-century women writers
20th-century Serbian poets
20th-century Serbian painters
Serbian women painters
20th-century women artists
Accidental deaths in New York (state)